Pablo Octavio Jara Rojas (born 2 April 1994) is a Chilean footballer who plays as a goalkeeper for Tormenta FC in USL League One.

Career

Professional
After a successful season with Tormenta FC in the PDL, Jara was signed by the team ahead of their inaugural season in USL League One. He made his professional debut for the club on March 29, 2019 in a 1-0 home victory over the Greenville Triumph.

References

External links
 
 
 Profile at Wingate Athletics

1994 births
Living people
Footballers from Santiago
Chilean footballers
Chilean expatriate footballers
Association football goalkeepers
Colo-Colo B footballers
Wingate Bulldogs men's soccer players
Tormenta FC players
Segunda División Profesional de Chile players
USL League One players
USL League Two players
Expatriate soccer players in the United States
Chilean expatriate sportspeople in the United States